Rydalmere Lions FC are a football (soccer) club, from the suburb of Rydalmere in the city of Parramatta. The club is also known as Rydalmere Football Club and Rydalmere FC and was founded in 1979. The Men's team currently plays in the NSW League One (formerly NSW NPL2) competition, the second tier of football in New South Wales and the third tier in Australia when including the national competition, the A-League. They gained promotion to NSW NPL2 after finishing as premiers of the 2017 NSW NPL 3. In 2022, National Premier Leagues NSW 3 competition rename as NSW League Two and as end of season 2022, finish tops 8 and earning promotion back in NSW League One in 2023, due to a restructuring of Football NSW competitions.

History
The club was formed as St. Joseph’s Zgharta Soccer Club in 1979. In addition to competing in the Football NSW National Premier Leagues structure, they also provide football for all age groups at the grassroots level participating in competitions within the Granville & Districts Soccer Football Association as Rydalmere FC. In 2014 the club merged with Fairfield City Lions to commencing competing in Football NSW competitions under the Rydalmere Lions FC banner.

Club Colours and Kit
The club wear a predominantly red shirt with white on the sleeves and neck, red shorts and red socks.

Seasons

Men's League

^ as Fairfield City Lions

Men's Cup

References

External links
 Club Website

Rydalmere Lions FC
Soccer clubs in Sydney
Association football clubs established in 1979